Charles Bathurst (c. 1703–1743) of Clints and Skutterskelfe, Yorkshire was a British politician who sat in the House of Commons briefly from 1727 to 1728

Bathurst was the son of Charles Bathurst of Clints and Skutterskelfe, Yorkshire, and his wife Frances Potter, daughter  of Thomas Potter merchant of Leeds. He was educated at Richmond, Yorkshire, and was admitted at Peterhouse, Cambridge on 25 April 1720, aged 16. In 1724 he succeeded his father. He was a prominent freemason,

Bathurst was   High Sheriff of Yorkshire for the year 1727 to 1728. At the 1727 British general election,  he was returned as Member of Parliament for Richmond wth Sir Marmaduke Wyvill.  Their friend  the mayor, who was returning officer, allowed a large number of unqualified persons to vote for them. On petition the seats were awarded to their opponents on 14 March 1728. He did not stand again.

Bathurst   became insane. In 1730 he killed his butler but the coroner's inquest decided he had acted in self-defence. It was also said that at an inn,  he threw a waiter downstairs and broke his leg, telling the innkeeper to put it in the bill.  He married Anne Hendry, sister of John Hendry of Norbon, county Durham on 16 February 1736.

Bathurst died in 1743  and was buried on 24 September.  He was described in his obituary  as ‘a man of vivacity, integrity, and generosity’.

References

 

1700s births
1743 deaths
Members of the Parliament of Great Britain for English constituencies
British MPs 1727–1734
Charles
High Sheriffs of Yorkshire